"Don't Fight the Sea" is a song written by Terry Jacks and released as a single in 1976, reaching #31 on the Canadian Charts.

Al Jardine version

The song was attempted by the Beach Boys in 1976 during recording sessions for their album 15 Big Ones. In 2010, the song was rewritten with Al Jardine for his album A Postcard from California and with several of his Beach Boys bandmates making a guest appearance, with vocals culled from various recording sessions during the interim period. Jardine's version was also issued on a 7" vinyl record on April 16, 2011 for Record Store Day 2011 in a limited edition of 2,500 copies (1,000 white vinyl and 1,500 black vinyl) with the proceeds to benefit tsunami relief for Japan.

References

Songs about oceans and seas
1976 singles
2011 singles
The Beach Boys songs
Environmental songs
1976 songs
Capitol Records singles
Songs written by Al Jardine
Songs written by Terry Jacks